Robert Hürlimann (born 18 August 1967 in Solothurn) is a Swiss curler.

Curling career 
Hürlimann was a member of the Swiss team that won a gold medal at the 1992 Winter Olympics when curling was a demonstration sport. Later that year, he won a bronze medal at his first appearance at the European Curling Championships.

Hürlimann played in his first World Curling Championship in 1998, as the alternate for the Swiss team, but he didn't play any games. He wouldn't return to international competition until 2008, when he played second for Stefan Karnusian at the European Curling Championships. The team finished fourth, with a record of 6-4.

In 2010, Hürlimann, still as second for skip Karusian, played at the World Championships in Cortina d'Ampezzo, Italy.  Later that year, Hürlimann earned his second bronze medal at the European Curling Championships, this time playing second for skip Christof Schwaller. A few months later, Hürlimann played for Team Schwaller at the 2011 World Championship, where they finished 7th with a record of 6-5.

Hürlimann returned to the Olympics at the 2014 Winter Games in Sochi, as coach of the Swiss men's team.

Personal life 
Hürlimann grew up in Solothurn. He works at a telecom infrastructure installation company.

Teams 
1992 Albertville Olympic Games

 Urs Dick, skip
 Jürg Dick, third
 Robert Hürlimann, second
 Thomas Kläy, lead
 Peter Däppen, alternate

1998 World Men's Curling Championship

 Christof Schwaller, skip
 Marc Haudenschild, third
 Reto Ziegler, second
 Rolf Iseli, lead
 Robert Hürlimann, alternate

2010 World Men's Curling Championship

 Stefan Karnusian, skip
 Christof Schwaller, third
 Robert Hürlimann, second
 Rolf Iseli, lead
 Dominic Andres, alternate

2011 World Men's Curling Championship

 Christof Schwaller, skip
 Marco Ramstein, third
 Robert Hürlimann, second
 Urs Eichhorn, lead
 Sven Michel, alternate

References

External links

Living people
Swiss male curlers
1967 births
People from Solothurn
Curlers at the 1992 Winter Olympics
Olympic curlers of Switzerland
Swiss curling champions
Sportspeople from the canton of Solothurn
20th-century Swiss people